Kalidas Dih is a historical and holy place located approximately in Uchchaith Sthan village in Madhubani district of Bihar, India. It is associated with the Sanskrit scholar, playwright and dramatist Kalidasa.  In this village, there is a mud mound known as Kalidas Dih. There are statues of Kalidasa and his works. It is believed that Kalidasa wrote most of his books here. It is one of the memorial monument of Kalidasa. He got enlightenment here by the blessings of Uchchaith Bhagwati. He spent his earlier life in a Gurukul near the site. Every year in the month of October, Bihar Government organises a government festival in the memory of Kalidasa known as Mahakavi Kalidas Mahotsav. This place has been recognised as a tourist centre for Hindu pilgrims.

References 

Kalidasa
Monument Avenue
Mithila

Hindu holy cities
Hindu temples in Bihar
Tourist attractions in Bihar